The 2007 Challenge Bell was a tennis tournament played on indoor carpet courts. It was the 15th edition of the Challenge Bell, and was part of the Tier III tournaments of the 2007 WTA Tour. It was held at the PEPS de l'Université Laval in Quebec City, Canada, from October 29 through November 4, 2007.

Entrants

Seeds

1 Rankings are as of October 15, 2007

Other entrants
The following players received wildcards into the singles main draw:
 Lindsay Davenport  
 Stéphanie Dubois
 Marie-Ève Pelletier

The following players received entry from the qualifying draw:
 Sofia Arvidsson  
 Julie Ditty
 Marina Erakovic
 Abigail Spears 

The following players received entry as lucky losers:
 Alina Jidkova
 Andreja Klepač

Retirements
 Alina Jidkova (dizziness)
 Tatjana Malek (ear infection)
 Ahsha Rolle (right knee sprain)
 Nicole Vaidišová (right wrist injury)

Champions

Singles

 Lindsay Davenport def.  Julia Vakulenko, 6–4, 6–1

Doubles

 Christina Fusano /  Raquel Kops-Jones def.  Stéphanie Dubois /  Renata Voráčová, 6–2, 7–6(8–6)

External links
Official website

Challenge Bell
Tournoi de Québec
Challenge Bell
2000s in Quebec City